Jordi Codina Rodríguez (born 27 April 1982) is a Spanish former professional footballer who played as a goalkeeper.

Club career
Born in Barcelona, Catalonia, Codina arrived at Real Madrid in 2002 at the age of 20, having been grown in the youth system of local RCD Espanyol. After the departure of Carlos Sánchez and David Cobeño, he became first-choice with the reserve side – Antonio Adán was the backup and Kiko Casilla third-choice, as he eventually gained Castilla's captaincy.

Codina made his professional debut in the second division in the 2005–06 season, against Sporting de Gijón. In the last of his five years with the B-team, he played 35 of 38 games for a total of 3,150 minutes.

At the start of 2007–08, Codina was promoted to Real Madrid's main squad as third goalkeeper, after Iker Casillas and Jerzy Dudek. As they had already been crowned league champions, he made his first and sole official appearance for the club in the last match of the campaign, playing the full 90 minutes in a 5–2 home win against Levante UD on 18 May 2008.

On 2 July 2009, Codina moved to fellow La Liga side Getafe CF, also in Madrid, on a free transfer, signing a three-year contract and reuniting with former Castilla manager Míchel. In his debut season and the following, he constantly battled for first-choice status with Argentine Óscar Ustari.

Codina left in June 2015, after his link expired. On the 11th, aged 33, he moved abroad for the first time in his career and signed a two-year deal with Cypriot club APOEL FC. On 7 January 2016, however, after failing to appear in any competitive games, he joined fellow First Division team Pafos FC on a six-month loan.

On 16 July 2016, Codina cut ties with APOEL by mutual consent. Shortly after, he returned to Spain after agreeing to a one-year contract with second level team CF Reus Deportiu.

Subsequently, Codina competed in his country's lower leagues, with CF Fuenlabrada and CD Móstoles URJC.

Career statistics

Honours
Real Madrid
La Liga: 2007–08
Supercopa de España: runner-up 2007

References

External links
APOEL official profile

1982 births
Living people
Footballers from Barcelona
Spanish footballers
Association football goalkeepers
La Liga players
Segunda División players
Segunda División B players
Tercera División players
CF Damm players
Real Madrid Castilla footballers
Real Madrid CF players
Getafe CF footballers
CF Reus Deportiu players
CF Fuenlabrada footballers
CD Móstoles URJC players
Cypriot First Division players
APOEL FC players
Pafos FC players
Catalonia international footballers
Spanish expatriate footballers
Expatriate footballers in Cyprus
Spanish expatriate sportspeople in Cyprus